Olha Kotovska (born 5 December 1983) is a Ukrainian long distance runner who specialises in the marathon. She competed in the women's marathon event at the 2016 Summer Olympics.

References

External links
 

1983 births
Living people
Ukrainian female long-distance runners
Ukrainian female marathon runners
Place of birth missing (living people)
Athletes (track and field) at the 2016 Summer Olympics
Olympic athletes of Ukraine